Yağız is a Turkish masculine given name. Notable people with the name include:

 Yağız Can Konyalı (born 1991), Turkish actor
 Yağız Kaba (born 1989), Turkish basketball player
 Yağız Göktuğ Taşbulak (born 1991), Turkish footballer

Turkish masculine given names